Paul Brydges (born June 21, 1965) is a Canadian former ice hockey centre.  He played fifteen games in the National Hockey League for the Buffalo Sabres during the 1986–87 season.  He has also worked as an assistant coach for the Ontario Hockey League's Guelph Storm.

Brydges was born in Guelph, Ontario.

Career statistics

External links

1965 births
Living people
Buffalo Sabres players
Canadian ice hockey centres
Guelph Platers players
Ice hockey people from Ontario
New Haven Nighthawks players
Rochester Americans players
Sportspeople from Guelph
Undrafted National Hockey League players